Juan de la Cierva y Peñafiel ( - ) was a Spanish politician and lawyer, who served during the reign of Alfonso XIII as Minister of Public Instruction and Fine Arts, of the Interior, of War, and of Finance and Development, and in the last government of the monarchy as Minister of Development.

Cierva was born Mula, Murcia, the son of lawyer and notary public Juan de la Cierva y Soto. He married a daughter of the banker Eleuterio Peñafiel, who was active between 1860 and 1896.

He graduated in law from the University of Madrid, beginning his political career with the Spanish Partido Liberal-Conservador as a councillor in 1895, and became the Mayor of Murcia and provincial leader of the Conservatives. In 1896, he was given writ to stand as a deputy congressman for the region of his birth, but failed to be elected.

During the Spanish Civil War he took refuge in the embassy of Norway. Because there was no medicine there, and such a deprivation of provisions, he contracted tuberculosis and suffered severe conditions, dying on the 11th of January, 1938.

Politician 

From 1902, Cierva built a network of political secret contacts, who maintained absolute power of the people, in exchange for political loyalty to the royal family. Cierva's political hegemony was strained by the class struggle and the establishment of the Spanish Second Republic.

He was the Minister for Education and the Minister for Arts December 16, 1904 and April 8, 1905, respectively, in separate governments presided by Marcelo Azcárraga Palmero and Raimundo Fernández Villaverde.

Between January 25, 1907, and October 21, 1909, he was the Minister of the Interior. He was also Minister of War twice: from 3 November 1917 to March 22, 1918, where he was in the cabinet of Manuel García Prieto, and from 14 August 1921 to March 8, 1922 in Antonio Maura's government.

Under this government, he was also the Finance Minister, from April 15 to 20 July 1919.

References

External links

  Online biographical dictionary of the Region of Murcia

1864 births
1938 deaths
Economy and finance ministers of Spain
19th-century Spanish lawyers
Politicians from the Region of Murcia
Interior ministers of Spain
Civil governors of Madrid